S.C. Braga is a Portuguese football club based in the northern city of Braga. They have competed in European competitions organised by UEFA: the UEFA Cup Winners' Cup, UEFA Europa League (formerly UEFA Cup), UEFA Intertoto Cup and UEFA Champions League.

Its first entry was in the 1966–67 European Cup Winners' Cup, reaching the second round. Since its entry into the 2004–05 UEFA Cup, Braga competed in European competition for ten seasons. It defeated Turkey's Sivasspor 5–0 on aggregate to win the 2008 UEFA Intertoto Cup, entered the Champions League for the first time in 2010–11, and that same season reached the Europa League Final which it lost 1–0 to compatriots FC Porto.

Brazilian forward Alan is the club's highest appearance-maker and goalscorer in European football, with 11 goals in 59 games.

History

Early history
After winning the 1965–66 Taça de Portugal by defeating Vitória de Setúbal 1–0 in the final, Braga qualified for its first European competition, the 1966–67 European Cup Winners' Cup. Drawn against Greek team AEK Athens in the first round, Braga won 1–0 away in the first round and 3–2 at home in the second to advance 4–2 on aggregate. In the second round, they met Raba ETO Győr of Hungary, losing 3–0 away in the first leg and winning 2–0 at home in the second, to lose 3–2 on aggregate.

Twelve years later, Braga returned to European football by finishing fourth in the 1977–78 Primeira Divisão to qualify for the 1978–79 UEFA Cup. In the first round, they played Hibernians of Malta, winning the first leg 5–0 at the Estádio 1º de Maio on 13 September 1978, the team's record victory in Europe. They lost the second leg 3–2 but still advanced on aggregate. In the next round, Braga lost 3–0 on aggregate to England's West Bromwich Albion.

Braga lost 4–0 to Sporting CP in the final of the 1981–82 domestic cup, but as the opponents also won the league to qualify for the European Cup, Braga entered the 1982–83 European Cup Winners' Cup. They played the preliminary round against Swansea City of Wales, losing 3–0 in the first leg and winning the second leg 1–0 at home to no avail. Braga again came fourth in the 1983–84 Primeira Divisão to enter the 1984–85 UEFA Cup. In the first round, they met reigning champions Tottenham Hotspur of England, losing 9–0 on aggregate; the 6–0 loss in the second leg at White Hart Lane on 3 October 1984 is Braga's joint biggest European defeat.

After a further 13 years without entry in European competition, Braga came fourth in the 1996–97 Primeira Divisão to enter the 1997–98 UEFA Cup. They met Dutch team Vitesse in the first round, losing 2–1 away in the first leg; Mladen Karoglan got the crucial consolation in the last minute. Two goals from Artur Jorge won the second leg 2–0, putting Braga into the second round where they won 5–0 on aggregate against Dinamo Tbilisi. In the third round, the last 16, Braga held Germany's Schalke 04 to a goalless home draw in the first leg, then lost 2–0 in the second.

After losing 3–1 to Porto in the 1997–98 Taça de Portugal final, Braga entered the 1998–99 UEFA Cup Winners' Cup, the final running of the tournament. In the first round, they met Latvia's Liepājas Metalurgs, drawing 0–0 in the first leg away before a 4–0 second leg win. They then played Lokomotiv Moscow, losing 3–1 in the Russian capital; Karoglan scored the only goal of the home game but did not change the outcome.

Note: Braga score always listed first.

Consistent entries
Braga came 5th in the 2003–04 Primeira Liga to qualify for the 2004–05 UEFA Cup, their first European competition for six years. They were drawn in the first round against Heart of Midlothian from Scotland. They lost the first leg 3–1 at Murrayfield Stadium, and drew 2–2 in the second leg at the Estádio Municipal de Braga to be eliminated. With a 4th-place domestic finish, Braga entered the next edition of the same competition and again fell at the first hurdle to Serbo-Montenegrin team Red Star Belgrade on the away goals rule.

After again finishing fourth, Braga entered the 2006–07 UEFA Cup, and defeated Italy's Chievo 3–2 on aggregate in the first round with an extra-time winner by Wender in Verona. The team came third of five in their group, defeating Slovan Liberec and Grasshopper while losing to AZ and Sevilla. In the round of 32, they defeated another Italian team Parma 1–0 in each leg. Braga then met Tottenham in the last 16, losing each leg 3–2 to be eliminated.

A third consecutive placement of fourth in the domestic league gave Braga a place in the 2007–08 UEFA Cup. Despite losing the first leg 2–1 in Sweden, they defeated Hammarby IF 5–1 on aggregate in the first round. Braga negotiated their group undefeated, drawing with Bolton Wanderers, Bayern Munich and Aris before a 2–0 home win over Red Star. In the last 32, they lost 4–0 on aggregate to Germany's Bayer Leverkusen.

Braga finished 7th in the 2007–08 Primeira Liga and therefore entered into the third round of the 2008 UEFA Intertoto Cup, where they defeated Turkish club Sivasspor 5–0 on aggregate to enter into the 2008–09 UEFA Cup. After wins over Zrinjski Mostar and Artmedia Petržalka, the team advanced from their group in third place after winning just one game, 3–0 at home to England's Portsmouth in the opener. After a 4–1 aggregate win over Standard Liège, the team was eliminated in the last 16 by Paris Saint-Germain through a late strike by substitute Guillaume Hoarau.

By coming 5th in the league, Braga entered the third qualifying round of the 2009–10 UEFA Europa League and lost 4–1 on aggregate to Elfsborg.

Note: Braga score always listed first.

2010–11: First Champions League appearance and Europa League Final

Braga finished a best-ever second in the 2009–10 Primeira Liga, and so entered the 2010–11 UEFA Champions League, their first time in Europe's primary competition. They began in the third qualifying round against Celtic of Scotland, winning 3–0 in the home leg and losing 2–1 away. In the play-off, Matheus headed the only goal of the home game against Sevilla, and away at the Ramón Sánchez Pizjuán Stadium, Lima scored a hat-trick in a 4–3 win.

In the first game of the group stage on 15 September 2010, Braga lost 6–0 to Arsenal, from whom they got their "Arsenalistas" nickname, at the Emirates Stadium, equalling their worst European result. After a 3–0 home loss to Shakhtar Donetsk they won both games against Serbia's Partizan, and then Matheus struck two late goals in a home win over Arsenal. However, a 2–0 away loss to Shakhtar meant that Braga came 3rd in their group and dropped into the Europa League.

After a 2–1 aggregate win over Poland's Lech Poznań, Braga faced Liverpool in the last 16, winning 1–0 with an early penalty from Alan after Sotirios Kyrgiakos brought down Mossoró. In the quarter-finals, they conceded from Dynamo Kyiv's Andriy Yarmolenko after six minutes, but seven minutes later Oleh Husyev's own goal gave them an away-goals victory.

In an all-Portuguese semi-final against Benfica, Braga lost the first leg 2–1 at the Estádio da Luz via an Óscar Cardozo free kick. However, in the second leg, a first-half header by Custódio gave Braga the victory on away goals and put them into their first major final. In the 2011 UEFA Europa League Final at Dublin's Aviva Stadium on 18 May 2011, Braga met fellow northerners Porto, losing 1–0 to a header by Radamel Falcao just before half time.

Note: Braga score always listed first.

Recent history 

Another 4th-place finish qualified Braga for the 2011–12 UEFA Europa League, where in the play-off they met Switzerland's Young Boys, drawing the first leg 0–0 at home and the second 2–2 away to advance on away goals. They advanced through the group in second place with three wins and two draws, including a 5–1 home win over Maribor. In the last 32, they fell 2–1 on aggregate to Turkey's Beşiktaş, for whom the Portuguese winger Simão scored.

By coming 3rd in the domestic league, Braga returned to the 2012–13 UEFA Champions League, winning in a penalty shootout in the play-off at Italy's Udinese as Beto saved a Panenka-style attempt from Maicosuel. Braga came last in their group, losing all of their games apart from a 2–0 win over Galatasaray in Turkey.

Braga were eliminated from the play-off of the 2013–14 UEFA Europa League by Romania's Pandurii and missed out on European football the next season for the first time in a decade by finishing 9th in the domestic league. They returned to the 2015–16 UEFA Europa League by finishing 4th, earning a bye to the group stage, which they won with four victories from six games. In the last 32, they won 4–3 on aggregate against Swiss team Sion, with Nikola Stojiljković scoring in each leg. Against Turkey's Fenerbahçe in the last 16, Braga recovered from a 1–0 loss in the first leg to win 4–2 on aggregate. Their run ended in the quarter-finals against Shakhtar, losing the first leg 1–2 at home. In the second, they lost 4–0 away, with Ricardo Ferreira scoring two own goals.

Last updated: 23 February 2023Note: Braga score always listed first.

Honours
 UEFA Intertoto Cup
 Winners (1): 2008

Overall record

By competition

Finals

Notes

References

External links
SC Braga at UEFA.com

Europe
Braga